Christina Elisabeth Nesse Bjordal (born 25 September 1980 in Haugesund, Norway) is a Norwegian jazz singer.

Career 
Bjordal let out her debut album Where Dreams Begin, within Christina Bjordal Band in 2003. Two years later she signed up with Universal Music, which resulted in a new solo album Brighter Days (2006). On the latest solo release Warrior of Light (2009) Bjordal is joined by a cream team of musicians, among them Bugge Wesseltoft, Nils Petter Molvær, Mathias Eick, Bendik Hofseth and Nils-Olav Johansen. During the last couple of years she has established her name in the Norwegian vocal jazz genre. They were granted great reviews. She puts her heart into the album with her own lyrics and melodies. Bjordal received the Sildajazzprisen in 2007.

Recently Bjordal has performed at several jazz festivals, like Kongsberg Jazzfestival, both with her solo projectsand opening a concert together with Karin Krog, Nattjazz in Bergen, Oslo Jazz festival, Canal Street, the Jazz and Blues Festival in Arendal, Sildajazz in Haugesund, and Edinburgh Jazz and Blues Festival. She has also performed at Norwegian embassies in both London and Edinburgh.

Honors 
2007: Sildajazzprisen

Discography

Solo albums 
Within Christina Bjordal Band
2003: Where Dreams Begin (Universal Music)

As soloist
2006: Brighter Days (Universal Music).
2009: Warrior of Light (Universal Music).

Collaborative works 
With various artists
2007: New Voices (EmArcy)
2007: Verve Today (Verve Records)

References

External links 

Norwegian women jazz singers
Norwegian jazz composers
Musicians from Haugesund
1980 births
Living people
20th-century Norwegian women singers
20th-century Norwegian singers
21st-century Norwegian women singers
21st-century Norwegian singers
20th-century Norwegian women